A statue of Benjamin Franklin stands outside Franklin High School, in Portland, Oregon's South Tabor neighborhood, in the United States. A work by the sculptor George Berry and his assistants, it was installed in 1942.

Description and history
The sculpture was one of two Works Progress Administration (WPA) projects benefitting Franklin between 1939 and 1942; the other was the construction of the school's athletic field. The statue was funded by Franklin alumni and students, who raised $15,000 to commission an artist from the Federal Art Project, one of WPA's five independent branches. George Berry and his team of assistants created a 40-ton sandstone statue of Franklin, which was erected at the school's north entrance, overlooking the athletic field, in 1942. The pedestal includes built-in benches and the inscription, "One today is worth two tomorrows."

In 2016, the statue was removed temporarily and then returned as part of a major renovation project.

See also

 1942 in art
 Benjamin Franklin in popular culture

References

Further reading

External links

 Benjamin Franklin, (sculpture). at the Smithsonian Institution
 Franklin Statue – Portland, OR at Waymarking
 Letter: Let's preserve the historic atmosphere of Franklin High School by Joyce (Pennie) Quinlin Gray (April 23, 2013), The Oregonian

1942 establishments in Oregon
1942 sculptures
Monuments and memorials in Portland, Oregon
Outdoor sculptures in Portland, Oregon
Sandstone sculptures in the United States
Sculptures of men in Oregon
South Tabor, Portland, Oregon
Statues in Portland, Oregon
Portland, Oregon
Stone sculptures in Oregon
Works Progress Administration in Oregon
Stone statues